That Most Important Thing: Love (original French title: L'important c'est d'aimer) is a French film directed by Polish filmmaker Andrzej Żuławski. It tells the story of a passionate love relationship between Nadine Chevalier, a B-List actress (Romy Schneider), and Servais Mont, a photographer (Fabio Testi), in the violent and unforgiving French show business.

In 1975, Żuławski coadapted and directed this movie, based on the novel by Christopher Frank  (unrelated to the 1973 François Truffaut film of that name). The success in France was such – it was featuring the very popular actress Romy Schneider and French singer Jacques Dutronc – that it allowed Żuławski to come back to Poland. The film had a total of 1,544,986 admissions in France.

Romy Schneider received the inaugural César Award for Best Actress for this role and Pedro Almodóvar dedicated his film All About My Mother partially to her in this role.

Plot 
Servais Mont, a photographer, meets Nadine Chevalier who earns her money starring in cheap soft-core movies. Trying to help her, he borrows the money from loan sharks to finance the theatrical production of Richard III and gives Nadine a part. Nadine is torn between Servais, with whom she is falling in love, and her husband Jacques, to whom she has moral obligations.

Cast 
 Romy Schneider as Nadine Chevalier
 Fabio Testi as Servais Mont
 Jacques Dutronc as Jacques Chevalier
 Claude Dauphin as Mazelli
 Roger Blin as Servais's father
  as Madame Mazelli
 Michel Robin as Raymond Lapade
 Guy Mairesse as Laurent Messala
 Jacques Boudet as Robert Beninge
 Katia Tchenko as Myriam, the whore
 Nicoletta Machiavelli as Luce, Lapade's wife
 Klaus Kinski as Karl-Heinz Zimmer
 Paul Bisciglia as Assistant director

U.S. release
It was originally released in the U.S. in the 1970s in a dubbed version titled That Most Important Thing: Love. The digitally restored French-language version made its cinematic debut in the U.S. in July 2017.

Reception
On review aggregator Rotten Tomatoes, 92% of 12 critics have given the film a positive review, with an average rating of 8.5/10.

Reviewing the full French version in Film Comment, Ela Bittencourt called it one of Żuławski's best films and a "passionate portrait of the dignity—and the indignities—of an actor's work." She also praised the director's "fluid, roving camera... so attentive to every pang, twinge, or slightest hint of agony that it seems to expose the characters’ every nerve." In a 4/4 star review from Chicago Reader, Ben Sachs said that "shining through L'Important C'Est D'Aimer is a genuine sense that love enables us to transcend the most degrading experiences." The New York Times wrote: "the searing, sometimes confounding film [...] showcases the heartbreaking talents of Schneider." Gene Moskowitz said in Variety: "Accepted in its own terms of an almost symbolical tale of human survival and love, it is an unusual pic served by first rate acting."

References

External links 
 
 That Most Important Thing: Love at UCM.ONE

1975 films
1975 romantic drama films
French romantic drama films
1970s French-language films
Films featuring a Best Actress César Award-winning performance
Films about actors
Films about theatre
Films directed by Andrzej Żuławski
Films scored by Georges Delerue
1970s French films